SecureDrop is a free software platform for secure communication between journalists and sources (whistleblowers). It was originally designed and developed by Aaron Swartz and Kevin Poulsen under the name DeadDrop. James Dolan also co-created the software.

History 
After Aaron Swartz's death, the first instance of the platform was launched under the name Strongbox by staff at The New Yorker on 15 May 2013. The Freedom of the Press Foundation took over development of DeadDrop under the name SecureDrop, and has since assisted with its installation at several news organizations, including ProPublica, The Guardian, The Intercept, and The Washington Post.

Security

SecureDrop uses the anonymity network Tor to facilitate communication between whistleblowers, journalists, and news organizations. SecureDrop sites are therefore only accessible as onion services in the Tor network. After a user visits a SecureDrop website, they are given a randomly generated code name. This code name is used to send information to a particular author or editor via uploading. Investigative journalists can contact the whistleblower via SecureDrop messaging. Therefore, the whistleblower must take note of their random code name.

The system utilizes private, segregated servers that are in the possession of the news organization. Journalists use two USB flash drives and two personal computers to access SecureDrop data. The first personal computer accesses SecureDrop via the Tor network, and the journalist uses the first flash drive to download encrypted data from the SecureDrop server. The second personal computer does not connect to the Internet, and is wiped during each reboot. The second flash drive contains a decryption code. The first and second flash drives are inserted into the second personal computer, and the material becomes available to the journalist. The personal computer is shut down after each use.

Freedom of the Press Foundation has stated it will have the SecureDrop code and security environment audited by an independent third party before every major version release and then publish the results. The first audit was conducted by security researchers at the University of Washington and Bruce Schneier. The second audit was conducted by Cure53, a German security firm.

SecureDrop suggests sources disabling JavaScript to protect anonymity.

Prominent organizations using SecureDrop

The Freedom of the Press Foundation now maintains an official directory of SecureDrop instances. This is a partial list of instances at prominent news organizations.

Awards 
 2016: Free Software Foundation, Free Software Award, Award for Projects of Social Benefit

See also 

 GlobaLeaks
 WikiLeaks

References

External links 
 
 
 SecureDrop at Freedom of the Press Foundation

Sources (journalism)
Free content management systems
Free software
2013 software
Whistleblowing
Tor onion services
Software using the GNU AGPL license